Odontolabis is a genus of beetles belonging to the family Lucanidae.

Description
The species of the genus Odontolabis are large (males up to 9 cm), oblong and shiny. Usually males have more or less enlarged head and jaws. The head and the pronotum usually are black, while elytra are often more or less brownish or yellowish. In some species the shape of the male's jaws have several different forms (polymorphism).

The species of this genus are native to Southeast Asia.

List of selected species 
There are approximately 61 species and subspecies in this genus:

 Odontolabis alces (Fabricius, 1775) - Philippines
 Odontolabis antilope von Rothenburg, 1901 - Borneo, Sumatra
 Odontolabis brookeana (Vollenhoven, 1861) - Borneo, Sumatra, Java
 Odontolabis burmeisteri (Hope, 1841) - India
 Odontolabis camela (Olivier, 1789) - Philippines
 Odontolabis castelnaudi Parry, 1862 - Malaya, Borneo, Sumatra
 Odontolabis cuvera Hope, 1842 – India, Vietnam
 Odontolabis dalmani (Hope & Westwood, 1845) - Sumatra
 Odontolabis delesserti (Guérin-Méneville, 1843) - India
 Odontolabis eremicola Mollenkamp, 1905 - Borneo
 Odontolabis femoralis Waterhouse, 1887 – Thailand, Borneo
 Odontolabis gazella (Fabricius, 1787) - Philippines, Malaya, Borneo, Sumatra
 Odontolabis hitam Nagai, 1986 - Sumatra
 Odontolabis imperialis Mollenkamp, 1904 - Philippines, Sarawak, Sabah
 Odontolabis lacordairei (Vollenhoven, 1861) - Sumatra
 Odontolabis latipennis (Hope & Westwood, 1845) - Malaya
 Odontolabis leuthneri Boileau, 1897 - Borneo
 Odontolabis lowei Parry, 1873 - Borneo, Sumatra, Java
 Odontolabis ludekingi (Vollenhoven, 1861) – Malaya, Sumatra
 Odontolabis macrocephala Lacroix, 1984 - Thailand, Vietnam
 Odontolabis micros de Lisle, 1970 - Sulawesi
 Odontolabis mollenkampi Fruhstorfer, 1898 - Sumatra
 Odontolabis mouhoti Parry, 1864 - Indochina
 Odontolabis pareoxa Bomans & Ratti, 1973 - India
 Odontolabis picea Bomans, 1986 - Sumatra
 Odontolabis platynota (Hope & Westwood, 1845) - Burma, Laos, Vietnam
 Odontolabis quadrimaculata Kriesche, 1920 - Sumatra
 Odontolabis relucens Mollenkamp, 1900 - Sumatra
 Odontolabis sinensis (Westwood, 1848) - Southwestern China
 Odontolabis siva (Hope & Westwood, 1845) – India, Taiwan, Malaya, Viet Nam
 Odontolabis sommeri Parry, 1862 – Borneo, Sumatra
 Odontolabis spectabilis Boileau, 1902 - Sumatra
 Odontolabis stevensi Thomson, 1862 – Sulawesi, Timor
 Odontolabis versicolor (Didier, 1931) - India
 Odontolabis vollenhoveni Parry, 1864 - Borneo
 Odontolabis wollastoni Parry, 1864 – Malaya, Sumatra
 Odontolabis yasuokai Mizunuma, 1994 - Sumatra

References 

 
Lucanidae genera